Maria Palaiologina may refer to:

 Maria Palaiologina (fl. 1265–1282), daughter of Emperor Michael VIII and Khatun of the Ilkhanate
 Maria Palaiologina Kantakouzene (fl. 1249–1294), niece of Emperor Michael VIII and Empress of Bulgaria
 Maria Palaiologina, Queen of Serbia (died 1355), great-granddaughter of Emperor Michael VIII
 Maria Palaiologina (Princess of Vereya) (died 1505), possibly a daughter of Andreas Palaiologos
 Mary Paleologus (died 1674), daughter of Theodore Paleologus